The 1994 Japan Series was the Nippon Professional Baseball (NPB) championship series for the 1994 season. It was the 45th Japan Series and featured the Pacific League champion Seibu Lions against the Central League champion Yomiuri Giants. The series was the eighth time the two franchises played each other for the championship.

Because this year's edition of the Japan Series took place during the Major League Baseball strike that scuttled the entire postseason, including the World Series, it received much more attention than normal in the United States. Most memorably, the cover of the October 31 issue of Sports Illustrated featured Lions pitcher Hisanobu Watanabe along with the tagline "The World's Series", in the Lions' 11-0 win in Game One.  Chicago-area Regional Sports Networks broadcast the game in English on a week delay basis, with Ken Harrelson being the lead broadcaster.  This resulted eventually in Major League Baseball acquiring Japanese players upon the end of the strike.

Two members of the winning Yomiuri Giants team -- Hideki Matsui (2009) and Dan Gladden (1987, 1991) -- also won a World Series.

This was the second Japan Series to feature night games after 1964 Japan Series although the night games were only on weekdays, and the first with a reduction in extra innings.  The Series, which had an 18-inning limit before a tie game, adopted a 15-inning limit before Series night games were tied.

Summary

Matchups

Game 1

Game 2

Game 3

Game 4

Game 5

Game 6

See also
Nippon Professional Baseball

References

External links
 Nippon Professional Baseball—Official website (in English)

Japan Series
Seibu Lions
Yomiuri Giants
Japan Series, 1994
Series